{{DISPLAYTITLE:C10H10O3}}
The molecular formula C10H10O3 (molar mass : 178.185 g/mol, exact mass : 178.062994 u) may refer to :
 Calone
 Coniferyl aldehyde
 Mellein, a dihydroisocoumarin
 3,4-(Methylenedioxyphenyl)-1-propanone
 3,4-(Methylenedioxyphenyl)-2-propanone
 3-Acetyl-6-methoxybenzaldehyde